In Royal Navy jargon, a man-of-war (also man-o'-war, or simply man) was a powerful warship or frigate of the 16th to the 19th century. Although the term never acquired a specific meaning, it was usually reserved for a ship armed with cannon and propelled primarily by sails, as opposed to a galley which is propelled primarily by oars.

Description
The man-of-war was developed in Portugal in the early 15th century from earlier roundships with the addition of a second mast to form the carrack. The 16th century saw the carrack evolve into the galleon and then the ship of the line. The evolution of the term has been given thus:

The man-of-war design developed by Sir John Hawkins had three masts, each with three to four sails. The ship could be up to 60 metres long and could have up to 124 guns: four at the bow, eight at the stern, and 56 in each broadside. All these cannons required three gun decks to hold them, one more than any earlier ship. It had a maximum sailing speed of eight or nine knots.

See also
 Portuguese man o' war, a jellyfish-like cnidarian so named because of its resemblance to a man-of-war ship at full sail
 Rating system of the Royal Navy, which classified warships into six "rates", a "first-rate" having the most armament, a "sixth-rate" the least
 Merchantman, a merchant ship
 East Indiaman, a ship of any of the East India Companies
Man o' War, an American Thoroughbred
 Manowar, an American heavy metal music band

References

External links

 Nautical References
 Project Gutenberg: The World of Waters
 Gallery of photos of men-of-war (Museo delle Navi, Bologna, Italy)

Age of Sail naval ships
Naval history
Naval sailing ship types
Warships